Buse Tosun (born 1995) is a Turkish freestyle wrestler. She is a member of Yalova Altınova Tersaneler SK.

Wrestling career 
She took part in the 63 kg event of the 2013 European Wrestling Championships in Tbilisi, Georgia and advanced to the semifinals. The same year, she won the gold medal in the 63 kg event at the European Junior Championships held in Skopje, Macefonia. At the 2013 World Championships in Budapest, Hungary, she lost in the event's first round.

She won the gold medal at the 2014 European Junior Women's Championships in Katowice, Poland. She participated at the 2014 World Championships in Taskent, Uzbekistan without success.

Tosun captured the bronze medal at the European Under-23 Championships in Wałbrzych, Poland. She competed in the 63 kg event of the 2015 European Games in Baku, Azerbaijan.

In 2016, she took the bronze medal in the 69 kg event of the European Championships held in Riga, Latvia. Tosun captured the gold medal at the 2016 European Under-23 Championships in Ruse, Bulgaria. She earned a quota spot at the 2016 Summer Olympics with her performance of placing second at the 2016 European Wrestling Olympic Qualification Tournament in Zrenjanin, Serbia. At the 2016 Olympics in Rio de Janeiro, Brazil, Tosun lost the repechage match in the 69 kg event, and failed so to win a medal.  She won the gold medal in the 68 kg event of the 2018 European U23 Championship held in Istanbul, Turkey.

In 2018, she won the gold medal in the women's 68 kg event at the European U23 Wrestling Championship held in Istanbul, Turkey.

In 2020, she won the silver medal in the women's 72 kg event at the 2020 Individual Wrestling World Cup held in Belgrade, Serbia. In March 2021, she competed at the European Qualification Tournament in Budapest, Hungary hoping to qualify for the 2020 Summer Olympics in Tokyo, Japan. She did not qualify at this tournament and she also failed to qualify for the Olympics at the World Olympic Qualification Tournament held in Sofia, Bulgaria. In June 2021, she won the silver medal in her event at the 2021 Poland Open held in Warsaw, Poland. In October 2021, she won one of the bronze medals in the women's 72 kg event at the World Wrestling Championships in Oslo, Norway.

In 2022, she won the silver medal in the 72 kg event at the European Wrestling Championships held in Budapest, Hungary. A few months later, she also won the silver medal in the 68 kg event at the 2022 Mediterranean Games held in Oran, Algeria. She won the gold medal in her event at the 2022 Tunis Ranking Series event held in Tunis, Tunisia. She won the gold medal in the 72 kg event at the 2021 Islamic Solidarity Games held in Konya, Turkey. She lost her bronze medal match in the 72 kg event at the 2022 World Wrestling Championships held in Belgrade, Serbia.

References

External links
 

Living people
1995 births
Sportspeople from İzmir
Turkish female sport wrestlers
Wrestlers at the 2015 European Games
European Games competitors for Turkey
Wrestlers at the 2016 Summer Olympics
Olympic wrestlers of Turkey
Competitors at the 2018 Mediterranean Games
Competitors at the 2022 Mediterranean Games
Mediterranean Games gold medalists for Turkey
Mediterranean Games silver medalists for Turkey
Mediterranean Games medalists in wrestling
Wrestlers at the 2019 European Games
World Wrestling Championships medalists
European Wrestling Championships medalists
20th-century Turkish sportswomen
21st-century Turkish sportswomen
Islamic Solidarity Games competitors for Turkey
Islamic Solidarity Games medalists in wrestling